The Communist Party of Italy (PCd'I) was a short-lived communist party in Italy which represented a transition from the Party of Italian Communists (1998–2014) and the Italian Communist Party (2016–present).

History 
The PCdI, which took the name from the 1921–1926 Communist Party of Italy (PCd'I), emerged in 2014 from a transformation of the Party of Italian Communists (PdCI), a communist party launched by splinters of the Communist Refoundation Party (PRC) in 1998. Before becoming a tiny party, the PdCI was a party of government and controlled dozens of seats in the Parliament.

Cesare Procaccini, a metalworkers' trade unionist who had replaced Oliviero Diliberto as PdCI's leader in 2013, was the party's secretary since its foundation while Manuela Palermi, a former senator, its president.

In 2016, the PCdI gave way to the Italian Communist Party (PCI), which took the name from the 1926–1991 PCd'I ninety years after the latter's foundation. PRC splinters and minor groups also joined the new party.

Leadership 
 Secretary: Cesare Procaccini (2014–2016)
 Coordinator: Alessandro Pignatiello (2014–2016)
 President: Manuela Palermi (2014–2016)
 Honorary President: Antonino Cuffaro (2014–2016)

References

External links 
 Official website

Defunct political parties in Italy
2014 establishments in Italy
Defunct communist parties in Italy
Political parties established in 2014